The canton of Givry is an administrative division of the Saône-et-Loire department, eastern France. Its borders were modified at the French canton reorganisation which came into effect in March 2015. Its seat is in Givry.

It consists of the following communes:
 
Barizey
Bissey-sous-Cruchaud
Bissy-sur-Fley
Buxy
Cersot
Châtel-Moron
Chenôves
Culles-les-Roches
Dracy-le-Fort
Fley
Germagny
Givry
Granges
Jambles
Jully-lès-Buxy
Marcilly-lès-Buxy
Mellecey
Mercurey
Messey-sur-Grosne
Montagny-lès-Buxy
Moroges
Rosey
Saint-Boil
Saint-Denis-de-Vaux
Saint-Désert
Sainte-Hélène
Saint-Germain-lès-Buxy
Saint-Jean-de-Vaux
Saint-Mard-de-Vaux
Saint-Martin-d'Auxy
Saint-Martin-du-Tartre
Saint-Martin-sous-Montaigu
Saint-Maurice-des-Champs
Saint-Privé
Saint-Vallerin
Santilly
Sassangy
Saules
Savianges
Sercy
Villeneuve-en-Montagne

References

Cantons of Saône-et-Loire